POK, PoK, or Pok may refer to:
 Pakistan-occupied Kashmir, the name used by India for the portion of Kashmir under Pakistani administration
 Pantoate kinase or PoK, an enzyme
 P.O.K. (Podosfairikes Omades Kentrou), a former coalition of football teams of Athens
 Pok (genus), a Hungarian medieval clan
 Pok, a character in the Pok & Mok animated series
 Pok, a dialect of the Sabaot language of Kenya
 Pok, Malaysia, a settlement in Sarawak, Malaysia
 Pokesdown railway station's station code
 Prophecy of Kings, an expansion to the 2017 board game Twilight Imperium: Fourth Edition

People with the surname
Pok Shau-fu (1909–2000), Hong Kong journalist
Pál Pók (1929–1982), Hungarian water polo player

See also
 Poc (disambiguation)
 Pock
 Pokémon